Ray Smith Bassler (July 22, 1878 – October 3, 1961) was an American geologist and paleontologist.

Biography
Bassler was born in 1878, in Philadelphia. When he was in high school he used to sell fossils for  Edward Oscar Ulrich. He got his bachelor's degree in 1902 from the University of Cincinnati, and received master's degree in 1903 and Ph.D. in 1905 from George Washington University. Starting from 1904 to 1948 he was an assistant professor there. From 1905 to 1931 he was working with Ferdinand Canu of France on Tertiary Polyzoa of the Atlantic and Gulf coasts. Starting from 1910 to 1922 he was working as a curator for the Division of Paleontology and for the Division of Stratigraphic Paleontology from 1923 to 1928 at the United States National Museum. By 1929 he was appointed as a head curator of the Department of Geology, a job that he kept till his promotion to associate in Paleontology in 1948. He died in 1961.

In 1925, he described the conodont families Prioniodinidae and Polygnathidae. In 1926, with E. O. Ulrich, he described the conodont genus Ancyrodella,

Tributes 
The conodont species name Neognathodus bassleri is a tribute to RS Bassler.

Publications

References

American geologists
American paleontologists
Conodont specialists
1878 births
1961 deaths
University of Cincinnati alumni
George Washington University alumni
Scientists from Philadelphia